The Yema Spica (斯派卡) is a minivan produced by the Chinese automaker Yema Auto since 2016.

Overview

Originally known as the Yema M302 before launch, the Yema minivan was revealed during the 2015 Chengdu Auto Show in China. 

The styling of the Yema Spica is especially controversial as the whole vehicle appears to be reverse engineered from the second generation Toyota Alphard. Like the Alphard, the Yema Spica is marketed as a MPV for chauffeur business while primarily made for the Chinese market. 

Unlike the Alphard's engine (2.4–3.5 liters), the Spica has a 1.5-liter engine. Prices of the Spica ranges from 59,800 yuan to 75,800 yuan.

See also
Chinese-made Alphard clones

 Refine M6 - First Chinese-made Alphard clone in 2013.
 Joylong iFly - Third Chinese-made Alphard clone in 2014.

Original Japanese-made Alphard
 Toyota Alphard

References

External links

Yema Spica official site

Spica
Minivans
Full-size vehicles
Cars introduced in 2015
Front-wheel-drive vehicles
2010s cars
Cars of China